The LKL All-Star Game Most Valuable Player (MVP) Award, is an annual professional Lithuanian Basketball League (LKL) award, that is given to the player(s) that are voted to be the best of the league's annual All-Star Game.

Winners

See also
LKL All-Star Game
LKL All-Star Day
LKL Three-point Shootout
LKL Slam Dunk Contest

External links 
 Official LKL website
 Official LKL YouTube.com channel
 Lithuanian league at Eurobasket.com

All-Star